Tanner v. United States, 483 U.S. 107 (1987), was a United States Supreme Court case in which the Court held that a jury verdict would not be overturned even when the jury had been consuming copious amounts of alcohol, marijuana, and cocaine during the course of the trial and deliberations.

Background 
After the defendant was found guilty of mail fraud, his attorneys filed several motions after they discovered that seven of the jurors drank alcohol during the noon recess. Four jurors consumed between them "a pitcher to three pitchers" of beer during various recesses. Of the three other jurors who were alleged to have consumed alcohol, one stated that, on several occasions, he observed two jurors having one or two mixed drinks during the lunch recess, and one other juror, who was also the foreperson, having a liter of wine on each of three occasions. Juror Hardy also stated that he and three other jurors smoked marijuana quite regularly during the trial. Moreover, Hardy stated that, during the trial, he observed one juror ingest cocaine five times and another juror ingest cocaine two or three times. One juror sold a quarter pound of marijuana to another juror during the trial, and took marijuana, cocaine, and drug paraphernalia into the courthouse.  One of the jurors described himself to Juror Hardy as "flying".

Opinion of the Court 
The court held that under Federal Rule of Evidence 606(b), the lower courts were correct in denying a hearing on juror misconduct.  The court noted that "the near-universal and firmly established common-law rule in the United States flatly prohibited the admission of juror testimony to impeach a jury verdict".

See also 
No-impeachment rule

References

External links

1987 in United States case law
Federal Rules of Evidence case law
United States Supreme Court cases
United States Supreme Court cases of the Rehnquist Court